Homalanthus polyandrus is a species of plant in the family Euphorbiaceae. It is endemic to New Zealand.

Description
Homalanthus polyandrus is a slender tree or shrub, 3-7m tall. Branches brittle. Leaves of younger plants are up to 30 cm in diameter; of adult plants 5–10 cm long.
Racemes slender and erect, 10–20 cm long, Male flowers are numerous, about 2mm in diameter. There are 1-5 female flowers at the base of the raceme, on quite long, slender pedicels.

References

Hippomaneae
Flora of New Zealand
Vulnerable plants
Taxonomy articles created by Polbot